9-Hydroxyhexahydrocannabinol (9-OH-HHC) is a semi-synthetic derivative of tetrahydrocannabinol. It is formed as an impurity in the synthesis of Delta-8-THC, and retains activity in animal studies though with only around 1/10 the potency of Δ9-THC, with the 9α- and 9β- enantiomers having around the same potency.

See also
 9-Nor-9β-hydroxyhexahydrocannabinol
 11-Hydroxyhexahydrocannabinol
 11-Hydroxy-THC
 11-Hydroxy-Delta-8-THC
 Cannabicitran
 Cannabitriol
 Delta-10-THC
 Hexahydrocannabinol

References 

Cannabinoids
Benzochromenes
Phenols